The following is a list of events affecting Philippine television in 2002. Events listed include television show debuts, finales, cancellations, and channel launches, closures and rebrandings, as well as information about controversies and carriage disputes.

Events
 October 27 – GMA Network Inc. launches the "Kapuso" branding.

Premieres

Unknown date
 August: Cristina on ABS-CBN 2
 December
 Maria Belen on GMA 7
 Smart Amazing Dreams on ABS-CBN 2

Unknown
 Ito Ang Balita on SBN 21
 Kumikitang Kabuhayan on ABS-CBN 2
 E.T.C. on ABS-CBN 2
 Paloma on ABS-CBN 2
 Romantica on ABS-CBN 2
 Daniela on ABS-CBN 2
 Kakasa Ka Ba? on ABS-CBN 2
 Gus Abelgas: Nag-Uulat on ABS-CBN 2
 PLDT Playtym on GMA 7
 Extra Showbiz on GMA 7
 Extra Ordinaryo on GMA 7
 Extra Lifestyle on GMA 7
 Extra Income on GMA 7
 Make Way for Noddy on GMA 7
 Up Close and Personal with Marissa del Mar on IBC 13
 Nora Mismo on IBC 13
 Kopi Shop on IBC 13
 The Main Event on IBC 13
 Travel: Philippines on IBC 13
 Novartis Payo ni Doc on RPN 9
 Match TV on RPN 9
 Side Stitch on RPN 9
 Task Force Siyasat on ABC 5
 Sabrina: The Animated Series on ABC 5
 Bugs on ABC 5
 24 on RPN 9
 JAG on RPN 9
 Seven Days on RPN 9
 Hidden Hills on RPN 9
 Still Standing on RPN 9
 Talitha Kum Healing Mass on NBN-4
 Openline on Net 25
 Donny & Marie on Net 25
 Home Grown on Net 25
 House Calls on Net 25
 Noli Me Tangere on Net 25
 Between the Lions on Net 25
 Lil' Elvis and the Truckstoppers on Net 25
 L'il Horrors on Net 25
 Top Story on ANC
 E! News Live on E! Philippines
 In The Raw on UNTV 37
 Strangebrew on UNTV 37
 Nip Fartor on UNTV 37
 Judging Amy on ZOE TV 11
 Everybody Loves Raymond on ZOE TV 11
 Edgemont on ZOE TV 11
 Sports Illustrated For Kids Show on ZOE TV 11
 Ladies Man on ZOE TV 11
 Mariú on ZOE TV 11

Programs transferring networks

Finales
January 4: Ronda Trese (IBC 13)
January 6: Viva Sinerama (GMA 7)
January 11: Flames (ABS-CBN 2)
January 25: Biglang Sibol, Bayang Impasibol (GMA 7)
January 27: Eezy Dancing (ABC 5) 
March 1: GMA Love Stories (GMA 7)
March 16: ABS-CBN News Updates (ABS-CBN 2)
March 23: Sarap TV (ABS-CBN 2)
April 5: Sorcerer Hunters (GMA 7)
April 8: The X Files (RPN 9)
April 10: 
 Level 9 (RPN 9)
 Buffy The Vampire Slayer (RPN 9)
April 13: Musika Atbp.  (IBC 13)
April 28: Anna Karenina (GMA 7)
May 3: Ghost Fighter (GMA 7)
May 7:
 Attagirl (ABS-CBN 2)
 !Oka Tokat (ABS-CBN 2)
May 9: Kasangga (GMA 7)
May 31: Wheel of Fortune (ABC 5)
June 1: Ang Munting Paraiso (ABS-CBN 2)
June 14: Natalia (IBC 13)
June 15: G-mik (ABS-CBN 2)
June 22: Hunter X Hunter (GMA 7)
July 5: Your Honor (ABS-CBN 2)
July 14: 
 5 and Up (GMA 7)
 GMA Network News (GMA 7) GMA News Live (GMA 7)
July 19: Talk TV (ABS-CBN 2)
July 28: Saint Peregrine: TV Sunday Mass (IBC 13)
August 2:
 Balita Alas Singko ng Umaga (ABS-CBN 2)
 Alas Singko Y Medya (ABS-CBN 2)
August 3: Digimon Adventure 02 (ABS-CBN 2)
August 4: Alas Singko Y Medya Weekend (ABS-CBN 2)
September 20: Pangako Sa 'Yo (ABS-CBN 2)
October 26: 
 Pinoy Blockbusters (GMA 7)
 Usapang Business (ABS-CBN 2)
November 1: Ikaw Lang ang Mamahalin (GMA 7)
November 8: Nunca te olvidaré (ABS-CBN 2)
November 9:
 K2BU (ABS-CBN 2)
 Mary D' Potter (ABS-CBN 2)
November 25: GMA's Best (GMA 7)
December 14: Who Wants to Be a Millionaire? (IBC 13)
December 25: PBA on Viva TV (IBC 13)
December 28: Family Feud (ABC 5)

Unknown dates
August: Tres mujeres (ABS-CBN 2)
October: The Weakest Link (IBC 13)
November: People First (IBC 13)

UnknownA Little Night of Music (GMA 7)Guidelines With Dr. Harold J. Sala (GMA 7)Jesus Miracle Crusade Ministry (GMA 7)The 700 Club Asia (GMA 7)The 700 Club (GMA 7)Word of Hope (GMA 7)Monica Brava (GMA 7)Isyu 101 (ABS-CBN 2)Bayani (ABS-CBN 2)Kabalikat, Loren Legarda (ABS-CBN 2)Da Pilya en da Pilot (ABS-CBN 2)Kakasa Ka Ba? (ABS-CBN 2)Sapul Kayo D'yan! (ABS-CBN 2)True Crime (ABS-CBN 2)Kids Club (ZOE TV 11)Kids Against Crime (ZOE TV 11)Side Stitch (ABC 5)Hershey's Kidz Town (ABC 5)Trabaho Lang! (ABC 5)Guide To Urban Living (Studio 23)Habang May Buhay (IBC 13)Hapi Kung Healthy (IBC 13)Pangako ng Lupa (IBC 13)Kagat ng Dilim (IBC 13)Kopi Shop (IBC 13)S.A.T.S.U. (IBC 13)Travel and Trade (IBC 13)Take Four (NBN 4)Maria del Cielo (IBC 13)Sigaw: The Campus Debate Series (NBN 4)MMDA: On The Road! (NBN 4)Philippines' Most Wanted (NBN 4)Kusina Atbp. (NBN 4)Lutong Bahay (NBN 4)Alicia (ABS-CBN 2)Judie Abott (ABS-CBN 2)Bubu Chacha (ABS-CBN 2)Jenny (ABS-CBN 2)Inuyasha (ABS-CBN 2)Cardcaptor Sakura (ABS-CBN 2)Ultraman Gaia (ABS-CBN 2)E! News Daily (E! Philippines)Sons Of Thunder'' (RPN 9)

Networks

Rebranded
 June - VID-OK → Myx

Births
January 8 - Andrea Abaya, actress
January 26 - Janelle Lewis, actress
January 28 - Janine Berdin, actress and singer
February 7 - Bianca De Vera, actress and singer 
February 16 - Kristen Gonzales, actress
February 28 - Ylona Garcia, singer and actress
March 3 - Chloe Redondo, singer
March 16 - Franchesca Salcedo, actress
April 5 - Golden Cañedo, singer and actress
April 9 - Sabine Cerrado, singer-songwriter
April 29 - Karina Bautista, actress
May 15 - Shanaia Gomez
May 16 
Shayne Sava, actress
Angela Ken, singer-songwriter and actress
June 10 - Belle Mariano, actress
July 9 - Seth Fedelin, actor
July 18 - Ogie Escanilla, actor and dancer
August 6 - Bailey May, singer and actor
August 31 - Gabb Skribikin, member of MNL48
September 3 -
Kyline Alcantara, actress and singer
Bugoy Cariño, actor
September 25 - Daniela Stranner, actress 
October 5 - Dale Baldillo, actor and model
November 26 - Coleen Trinidad, member of MNL48
December 9 - Timothy Chan, actor
December 13 - AC Bonifacio, dancer and actress

Deaths
 March 29: Rico Yan, Filipino matinee idol, model, film and television actor. acute hemorrhagic pancreatitis. (b. 1975)

See also
2002 in television

References

 
Television in the Philippines by year
Philippine television-related lists